The Travancore Fanam was a type of money that was issued by the State of Travancore, now mainly a part of Kerala in South India. The Fanams (also spelt Fanoms) and Chuckrams (or Chakrams) were known to be some of the smallest coins in the world. The word Fanam appears to be an Anglo-Germanic sound shift from the word Panam, which means money in Dravidian languages. Historically, the Fanam and Chuckram coins were the regular unit of currency in medieval Travancore and appear to have been extensively used for trading in the region of South India. The words Fanam and Panam literally mean money and are still used as a synonym for wealth in Kerala in the native language of Malayalam.

History

The Panam coins were part of the traditional coinage of Kerala, and the time from when these coins were issued is not known. The Panam coins rose in popularity some time in the 13th century CE and remained one of the most popular currencies in circulation in the following centuries. Other versions of the Fanams are also known to have been minted in Kerala by the kingdoms of Cochin and Kozhikode. The adjoining States in modern day Tamil Nadu, Karnataka and Sri Lanka are also known to have had their own versions of the Fanams. By the 18th century, the reduction in precious metal content had rendered the Travancore Fanam coins so small that they had become difficult to count. They were counted by pouring them in a pile onto a counting board (called palakas) and shaking them into the holes on the surface of the board.

The modern version of the Travancore Fanams were introduced into circulation around 1800 (975 M.E.) with a value equal to 4 Chuckrams. These modern versions were minted in Trivandrum (now called Thiruvananthapuram) with the aid of stamping presses obtained from Madras Presidency. Later issues were minted using presses procured from England. While the older versions of the Fanams were based on gold or silver, these newer coins were primarily based on silver. They were issued until 1946–47 remaining in circulation until 1949 before being replaced by the Indian Rupee and Anna system.

Inscriptions

Older issues of the Panam coins are inscribed with various symbols representing religious deities or nature, but issues from the 1860s onwards often had the names or insignia of the reigning monarch in English. The Fanam coins, when written in English, appear to display something similar to an Anglo-Germanic sound shift (called Grimm's law) from the traditional term "Panam". Panam literally means money in several Dravidian languages of South India and is still extensively used to refer to wealth.

The year, when printed on the Fanam coins was based on the Malayalam calendar (and corresponding Malayalam Era – M.E.) which begins circa 825 CE. Therefore, the year of issue of the coin can be found by adding 825 to it.

Example – The year of issue of a coin showing 1000, will be 1825 C.E. (or A.D.). Therefore, the year of issue of the coin with year 1116, as depicted in the images, will be 1940–41.

7 Fanams made up one Travancore Rupee, while the Fanam was composed of 4 Chuckrams. These Chuckrams were further divided into 16 Cash.

Thus,

References

See also

 Hyderabadi rupee
 Indian rupee
 Travancore rupee
 Travancore
 Madras fanam

Modern obsolete currencies
Coins of India
Historical currencies of India
Kingdom of Travancore
Economy of Kerala